The Division of McMahon is an Australian electoral division in the state of New South Wales.

McMahon is located in Sydney's Outer Western Suburbs. McMahon lies south of the Great Western Highway, roughly between Woodville Road and South Creek.

The current MP is Chris Bowen, a member of the Australian Labor Party.

History

The division was established in 2010 and is named in honour of former Australian Prime Minister Sir William McMahon. It replaced the abolished division of Prospect.

The current Member for McMahon, since the 2010 federal election, is the former member for Prospect, Chris Bowen, former interim leader of the Australian Labor Party.

In 2017, the division had the third-highest percentage of "No" responses in the Australian Marriage Law Postal Survey, with 64.9% of the electorate's respondents to the survey responding "No".

Boundaries
Federal electoral division boundaries in Australia are determined at redistributions by a redistribution committee appointed by the Australian Electoral Commission. Redistributions occur for the boundaries of divisions in a particular state, and they occur every seven years, or sooner if a state's representation entitlement changes or when divisions of a state are malapportioned.

The division is located in the western suburbs of Sydney, and includes the suburbs of Erskine Park, Fairfield Heights, Greystanes, Guildford West, Horsley Park, Merrylands West, Minchinbury, Mount Vernon, Old Guildford, Pemulwuy, Smithfield, St Clair, Wetherill Park, and Woodpark; as well as parts of Abbotsbury, Arndell Park, Blacktown, Bossley Park, Canley Vale, Cecil Park, Eastern Creek, Fairfield, Fairfield West, Guildford, Huntingwood, Kemps Creek, Merrylands, Orchard Hills, Prairiewood, Prospect, South Wentworthville, and Yennora.

Demographics 
McMahon is a diverse electorate, with slightly fewer electors of immigrant background than nearby Blaxland, Watson, and Fowler. Common ancestries in McMahon include Lebanese, Iraqi, Chinese, and Italian Australians. It has a mix of adherents to Catholicism at 36.1%, Islam at 11.5%, and other religions.

In the most recent election, Labor performed best in Fairfield, an ethnic enclave of Assyrians, while the Liberal Party did best in the rural precincts of Kemps Creek and Horsley Park in the west.

According to the 2016 census, 42.3% of people only spoke English at home. Other languages spoken at home including Arabic 12.8%, Vietnamese 4.8%, Assyrian Neo-Aramaic 4.1%, Spanish 2.1% and Mandarin 2.1%.

Members

Election results

References

External links
 Division of McMahon - Australian Electoral Commission

Electoral divisions of Australia
Constituencies established in 2010
2010 establishments in Australia